Karen Greenhalgh is an American politician who has represented the 85th district in the Virginia House of Delegates since 2022.

References

See also 

Living people
Year of birth missing (living people)
Politicians from Virginia Beach, Virginia
21st-century American politicians
21st-century American women politicians
Women state legislators in Virginia
Republican Party members of the Virginia House of Delegates